Barton is an unincorporated community in Phillips County, Arkansas, United States. Barton has a post office with ZIP code 72312.

Education 
Barton is home to the Barton–Lexa School District which provides early childhood, elementary and secondary education to more than 800 students in prekindergarten through grade 12. Students complete their studies at Barton High School.

References

Unincorporated communities in Phillips County, Arkansas
Unincorporated communities in Arkansas